Cooler at the Edge is the debut EP by Irish band Scullion and was released in 1989 on compact cassette by Gravepine Records, intended as a promotion EP with four tracks announced as taken from their forthcoming album at the time, the 1992 compilation Ghosts & Heroes, although they were not issued on this release. They were re-published on the 2001 retrospective album Eyelids Into Snow - A Collection. The EP was produced by Dónal Lunny.

Compact cassette track listing

Personnel
Scullion
Sonny Condell – acoustic guitar on "Betty & Bogey", vocals on tracks 1, 2 and 3, keyboards on tracks 1, 2 and 3, percussions on "Ghosts & Heroes", guitars
Philip King – vocals on "Cooler at the Edge" and "Ghosts & Heroes", harmonica on tracks 1, 3 and 4
Robbie Overson – acoustic guitar on "Cooler at the Edge" and "Betty & Bogey", electric guitar on "Betty & Bogey", vocals, guitars

Production
Dónal Lunny – production

Release history

References

1989 debut EPs
Scullion (group) albums